Edrissa Marong (1995/1996 – 23 January 2023) was a Gambian long distance runner.

Marong was the national record holder in the 800 meters and had represented The Gambia in the event after his 2015 appearance in the Ecowas junior championship in Banjul. He also represented The Gambia at the African championship in Mauritius in 2022. 

Marong died on 23 January 2023, at the age of 27.

References 

1990s births
Year of birth uncertain
2023 deaths
Gambian male athletes
21st-century Gambian people